Marie Elisabeth of France (27 October 1572 – 2 April 1578) was a French princess and member of the House of Valois. She was the only child of King Charles IX of France and Elisabeth of Austria. 

Marie Elisabeth’s maternal grandparents were Maximilian II, Holy Roman Emperor and Maria of Spain, and her paternal grandparents were Henry II of France and Catherine de' Medici.

Life
Born at the Louvre Palace in Paris, France, she was loved by her parents despite their inevitable disappointment that she was not the male heir for which they hoped. She was baptised almost four months later, on 2 February 1573 in Saint-Germain l'Auxerrois. Despite the religious and political controversy stemming from the Saint Bartholomew's Day Massacre (which had occurred only two months before her birth), one of her godmothers was the Protestant queen Elizabeth I of England, who sent William Somerset, 3rd Earl of Worcester as her proxy for the ceremony. Her other godmother and namesake was her maternal grandmother, the Holy Roman Empress, and her godfather was Emmanuel Philibert, Duke of Savoy. She was raised under the supervision of her governess, Isabelle de Crissé.

When Marie Elisabeth was less than two years old her father, King Charles IX, died and her uncle became Henry III of France. Hardly a year later, her mother returned to Vienna after Maximilian II repaid her dowry, while Marie Elisabeth, as a Daughter of France, remained behind. She was less than three years old at the time. Elisabeth and Marie said their farewells at the Château d'Amboise on 28 August 1575, never to see each other again.

Pierre de Bourdeille, seigneur de Brantôme, whose aunt, Madame Crissé, was Marie Elisabeth's governess, describes the princess in his writings.  He reports that she was pretty but also unusually intelligent and eager to learn, at times seeming more like an adult than a child. She memorised the names of her ancestors, both Valois and Habsburg, and would proudly tell everyone that she belonged to both of those great royal houses.

Dynastically, Marie Elisabeth was important because she was the only Valois grandchild of Henry II and Catherine de' Medici, despite them having raised four sons to adulthood.  Had Marie Elisabeth been male, she would have been heir to the throne of France and, had she lived long enough, might have continued the House of Valois into a new generation and prevented some of the subsequent wars over the succession and religion. Even as a female (i.e., barred by Salic law from inheriting the throne in her own right), as both the representative of the House of Valois and as a member of the House of Habsburg, she might have played a role in alleviating the succession crisis through her own marriage, possibly even becoming Queen consort of France.  Thus her early death was an indirect contributory cause of at least some of the strife that followed during her uncle Henry's reign and after his death.

Marie Elisabeth resided firstly in Amboise and Blois, but later she was moved to Paris. Apparently of frail health, she died on 2 April 1578 at the Hôtel d’Anjou, aged only five and a half years. She was deeply mourned by the court, despite her youth, for her kindness, grace and softness. Eight days later on 10 April, she was buried in a vault of the Basilica of Saint-Denis, next to her father.

On 17 October 1793 her tomb was desecrated by the revolutionaries during the French Revolution, and her remains were thrown into a common grave. In 1817 she was reinterred in the Basilica's Ossuary.

Ancestry

Footnotes

Additional bibliography 
 Jacqueline Boucher, Deux épouses et reines à la fin du XVIe siècle : Louise de Lorraine et Marguerite de France, Saint-Étienne, Publications of the University of Saint-Étienne, 1995, p. 60. In 1580, Queen Margaret of Navarre sold the Hôtel to her Chancellor Guy Du Faur, Seigneur de Pibrac.
 Oraison funebre de treshaute et vertueuse princesse Marie Isabeau de France fille de Treshaut et Treschrestien Roy Charles IX, amateur de toute vertu, et protecteur de la Foy. Pronounced in Notre-Dame of Paris on 11 April 1578, by Arnaud Sorbia, Royal Chaplain. This prayer was published in Lyon in 1578 by Rigaud Benoit, and is preceded by a dedicatory letter to Margaret de Valois, dated 16 April 1578. See Jacqueline Vons (éd.),Dédicace à l’Oraison funèbre et Tombeau de Marie-Élisabeth de France (1572-1578). Documents posted on Cour de France.fr on 3 May 2010 as part of the research project "La médecine à la cour de France". (Cour-de-france.fr: Article 1417).
 

French princesses
1572 births
1578 deaths
House of Valois
Burials at the Basilica of Saint-Denis
Royalty and nobility who died as children
Daughters of kings